The 2011 Welwyn Hatfield Borough Council election took place on 5 May 2011 to elect members of Welwyn Hatfield Borough Council in England. This was on the same day as other local elections.

Election result

Ward results

Brookmans Park and Little Heath

Haldens

Handside

Hatfield Central

Hatfield East

Hatfield Villages

Hatfield West

Hollybush

Howlands

Northaw and Cuffley

Panshanger

Peartree

Sherrards

Welham Green

Welwyn East

Welwyn West

References

2011 English local elections
2011
May 2011 events in the United Kingdom